Baraniec may refer to the following places:
Baraniec, Greater Poland Voivodeship (west-central Poland)
Baraniec, Ciechanów County in Masovian Voivodeship (east-central Poland)
Baraniec, Maków County in Masovian Voivodeship (east-central Poland)